The Aoi Oshitayashiki (葵 御下屋敷) is a former residence of the Owari branch of the Tokugawa clan, located in Aoi 1-chome in Higashi ward in Nagoya, central Japan.

It was constructed under the second Lord of the Owari Domain Tokugawa Mitsutomo (1625–1700) and subsequently enlarged and changed by following generations. The area consisted of the residential palace in the middle, with a large garden with ponds to the south. A special garden for ginseng was later located in the northwestern part. 

A climbing kiln was built for the 12th lord Tokugawa Naritaka (1810–1845), who had a keen interest in pottery. Here Kinjō Higashiyama ware was produced, a type of oniwa-yaki (御庭焼 literally "garden ware").

See also 
 Ōzone Oshitayashiki, another Tokugawa residence in the Higashi ward
 Kamiyashiki of Matsudaira Tadamasa in Edo
 Sankei-en and Rinshunkaku in Yokohama

References 

Buildings and structures in Nagoya
Demolished buildings and structures in Japan
History of Nagoya
Owari Tokugawa family